This is a list of foreign ministers of Niue.

1999–2002: Sani Lakatani
2002–2008: Young Vivian
2008–2020: Toke Talagi
2020-present: Dalton Tagelagi

Sources
Rulers.org – Foreign ministers L–R

Foreign
Foreign Ministers
Politicians